Monodesmus is a genus of beetles in the family Cerambycidae, containing the following species:

 Monodesmus atratus Fisher, 1932
 Monodesmus callidioides Audinet-Serville, 1832
 Monodesmus inermis Galileo, 1987
 Monodesmus nothus Chevrolat, 1862

References

Prioninae